Krzysztof Gustaw Sikora (born 4 February 1954 in Koronowo, Poland) is a Polish politician who was a current Member of Kuyavian-Pomeranian Regional Assembly and Assembly Chairperson from 2006 to 2010.

He is Chancellor of University of Economy in Bydgoszcz (Wyższa Szkoła Gospodarki).

In 2004 European Parliament election he was a candidate of Civic Platform from Kuyavian-Pomeranian constituency. He polled 4,515 votes and was not elected.

In 2006 local election he joined the Regional Assembly III term representing the 1st district. He scored 12,928 votes, running on the Civic Platform list. Assembly III Term elected him as Assembly Chairperson (Przewodniczący Sejmiku Województwa Kujawsko-Pomorskiego).

See also 
 Kuyavian-Pomeranian Regional Assembly

References

External links 
 (pl) Kuyavian-Pomeranian Regional Assembly webside
 (pl) Assembly Chairperson webside

1954 births
Living people
People from Bydgoszcz County
Civic Platform politicians
Members of Kuyavian-Pomeranian Regional Assembly